Ulaş Bardakçı (1947 – 19 February 1972) was 
a Marxist–Leninist revolutionary and a founding member of communist organisation People's Liberation Party-Front of Turkey.

Capture

In May 1971 Ulaş Bardakçı, together with Mahir Çayan and Hüseyin Cevahir, kidnapped Ephraim Elrom, the Israeli consul general in Istanbul, Turkey. They demanded the release of their comrades who were imprisoned following the 1971 Turkish military memorandum. Their demands were not met and Ephraim Elrom was killed by Bardakçı and his comrades. Following the 'Operation Hammer' of security forces to rescue Elrom, Bardakçı was captured and imprisoned.

Escape
Ulaş Bardakçı, along with five other revolutionaries imprisoned with him, escaped from military prison in November 1971 using the tunnel they dug out.

Death
Ulaş Bardakçı's hideout was surrounded by police forces on 19 February 1972. He did not surrender, and he was killed by the police.

References

1947 births
1972 deaths
Turkish communists
Stalinism
Anti-revisionists
Turkish People's Liberation Party–Front politicians
Turkish revolutionaries
Escapees from Turkish detention
Fugitives
Turkish escapees